The Faenza theatre is the oldest movie theatre in Bogotá, Colombia. It was opened on the site of a former ceramic factory on 3 April 1924 with the screening of a French film. The theatre was listed as a National Monument of Colombia on 11 August 1975 under decree 1584.

The building is an example of Art Nouveau architecture. After falling into disrepair, the theatre was restored from 2004 to 2007.

References

Theatres completed in 1924
Art Nouveau theatres
Theatres in Bogotá
Art Nouveau architecture in Colombia